Kallam is an Indian patronymic surname. Notable people with the surname include:

 Kallam Anji Reddy (1939–2013), Indian entrepreneur
 Kallam Satish Reddy, Indian business executive

Indian surnames
Patronymic surnames